Harry Allan (1882–1957) was a New Zealand teacher, botanist, scientific administrator and writer.

Harry Allan may also refer to:
Harry Allan (rugby union) (born 1997), New Zealand rugby union player
Henry Allan (footballer) (1872–1965), Scottish footballer
Harry Allan (footballer, born unknown), Scottish footballer

See also
Harry Allen (disambiguation)
Henry Allan (disambiguation)
Henry Allen (disambiguation)
Harold Allen (disambiguation)